"Remember Me"/"I Am a Cider Drinker" was a split single released by British Sea Power and The Wurzels. The 7" single features The Wurzels covering BSP's "Remember Me" and BSP covering The Wurzels' 1976 hit "I Am a Cider Drinker". The release was limited to 1,966 (the year Adge Cutler formed The Wurzels) and only available on BSP's November 2005 tour or through their official website.

The Wurzels' recording of "I Am a Cider Drinker" was one of the first singles ever bought by British Sea Power singers Scott and Neil Wilkinson (Yan and Hamilton). The 7" was purchased from a jumble sale in Natland, where they grew up.

Track listing

7" Vinyl (RTRADS302)

 "Remember Me" (performed by The Wurzels) (Yan/BSP) – 3:01
 "I Am a Cider Drinker" (performed by British Sea Power) (H. Bouwens) – 5:04

I Am a Cider Drinker 
"I am a Cider Drinker" is a cover version of Paloma Blanca, a song written by Dutch musician George Baker, first recorded and released by his band, the George Baker Selection. The song was a hit throughout Western Europe, reaching No. 1 in Austria, Finland, Flanders, Germany, the Netherlands, Sweden and Switzerland, and it also topped the charts in New Zealand and South Africa. The version of the song created by The Wurzels in 1976 contains a number of references to rural West Country life, referring to scrumpy, rabbit stew, combine harvesters and evenings at the local pub. A remastered version was produced in 2007, with an accompanying video. 

I Am a Cider Drinker has been further covered by the London ska band Bad Manners for their album Stupidity, as well as by the Scottish pirate metal band Alestorm as a bonus track in their album Back Through Time. 

A further parody of the song was created by the Rhodesian band Mike Westcott and Leprechaun with the name "I am a Shumba Drinker". Shumba referring to the Shona word for Lion, meaning Lion Lager, a well known South African produced beer.

References

External links
 BSP's Official Website
 The Wurzel's Official Website
 "Remember Me" at Salty Water (fansite)
 "I Am a Cider Drinker" at Salty Water (fansite)

British Sea Power songs
2005 singles